The following is the pre-election pendulum for the 2023 New South Wales state election. It is based on notional margins calculated by the ABC's Antony Green. Members in italics will not contest the election as a candidate for the seat they currently hold or its replacement. However, the currrent member for Holsworthy Melanie Gibbons will move to contest the seat of Kiama. By-elections were held in some seats during this term of Parliament that changed their margins. See the footnotes for details.

Notes

References 

Elections in New South Wales
March 2023 events in Australia
New South Wales Legislative Council
New South Wales
2020s in New South Wales
Pendulums for New South Wales state elections